Darryl Nelson Scott (born August 6, 1968) is an American former professional baseball pitcher and current pitching coach for the Colorado Rockies of Major League Baseball (MLB). He played in MLB for the California Angels.

High school and college
Scott was born in Fresno, California, and took up pitching when he was nine. Scott attended high school at Yuba City High School in Yuba City, California and pitched for their baseball team. He was recruited out of high school by Loyola Marymount University. He pitched for three years for the Loyola Marymount Lions, and during the 1988 season set a school record for saves in a season when he got his 12th in a game against the University of Nevada-Reno. After the 1988 season, he played collegiate summer baseball with the Harwich Mariners of the Cape Cod Baseball League and was named a league all-star. In 1990, his senior season, Scott struck out 90 batters, highest in the conference. Despite this, Scott was not selected in the 1990 Major League Baseball Draft. However, he was signed by the California Angels as an amateur free agent shortly after the draft on June 13, 1990.

Career
Scott played his first season with the Boise Hawks of the Northwest League. In 27 pitching appearances, he had an earned run average (ERA) of 1.34, and won two games and lost one. He moved up the next season to the Quad Cities Angels of the Midwest League, where he pitched in 47 games, finishing the season with an ERA of 1.55 and 19 saves. The following season he moved up to both the AA and AAA level minor league teams of the Angels, the Midland Angels and the Edmonton Trappers, respectively. He played in 27 games for Midland and again had an ERA under 2 (1.82) though with Edmonton he pitched in 31 games with a 5.20 ERA. After starting the 1993 season with the Vancouver Canadians, the Angels' new AAA affiliate, he was promoted to the Angels' roster, and made his major league debut on May 31, 1993.

Scott made his debut against the Toronto Blue Jays, and pitched a shutout eighth inning in a 10–5 loss. After pitching in five more games in relief, he was at a hospital on June 18 with his wife for the birth of their newborn son, and while at the hospital, received a call from Dan O'Brien Sr. telling him that he was being sent back down to the minors. After a couple months in Vancouver, Scott was called back up to the majors in September. He pitched in ten more games that season, and notched his only major league win on September 19 against the Texas Rangers. He made his final major league appearance on October 1, 1993, against the Oakland Athletics.

After being released by the Angels on November 16, 1993, he signed a contract with the Yokohama BayStars that same month. After a year, he came back to the minor leagues, and played for the Colorado Springs Sky Sox in the Colorado Rockies farm system in 1995. In 59 games, he went 4–10 with a 4.70 ERA. He spent the next two seasons with the Buffalo Bisons of the Cleveland Indians farm system, where he pitched 98 games in two seasons and had an ERA below three. Scott played for three minor league teams in 1999, and then spent the 2000 season with the Clearwater Phillies of the Philadelphia Phillies farm system, where he played in four games, as well as with three other farm teams. After pitching in 14 games with an ERA over 10 for the Tucson Sidewinders, the AAA affiliate of the Arizona Diamondbacks, he retired.

Starting in 2009, he has served as a pitching coach and minor league pitching coordinator in the Colorado Rockies organization.

On November 1, 2019, Scott was named the bullpen coach for the Colorado Rockies. On October 25, 2021, Scott was promoted to the title of pitching coach, after Steve Foster stepped down to spend more time with his family.

References

External links

1968 births
Living people
American expatriate baseball players in Canada
Baseball coaches from California
Baseball players from California
Boise Hawks players
Buffalo Bisons (minor league) players
California Angels players
Clearwater Phillies players
Colorado Rockies (baseball) coaches
Colorado Springs Sky Sox players
Edmonton Trappers players
Harwich Mariners players
Loyola Marymount Lions baseball players
Major League Baseball bullpen coaches
Major League Baseball pitchers
Midland Angels players
Minor league baseball coaches
Ottawa Lynx players
Quad Cities Angels players
Reading Phillies players
Scranton/Wilkes-Barre Red Barons players
Sportspeople from Fresno, California
Tucson Sidewinders players
Vancouver Canadians players
Yokohama BayStars players
Anchorage Bucs players
Alaska Goldpanners of Fairbanks players